Edward Sagarin (September 18, 1913 – June 10, 1986), also known by his pen name Donald Webster Cory, was an American professor of sociology and criminology at the City University of New York, and a writer. His book The Homosexual in America: A Subjective Approach, published in 1951, was considered "one of the most influential works in the history of the gay rights movement," and inspired compassion in others by highlighting the difficulties faced by homosexuals.

He was titled "father of the homophile movement" for asserting that gay men and lesbians deserved civil rights as members of a large, unrecognised minority. However, Vern L. Bullough believes the title is undeserved as Sagarin did not actively participate in resistance and did not join any homophile organisations until 1962, a time when he was seeking a topic to analyse in his thesis.

Biography

Early life
Sagarin was born in Schenectady, New York to Russian Jewish parents. Sagarin was born with scoliosis, which produced a hump on his back. He attended high school, and after graduating, spent a year in France where he met André Gide. Upon his return to New York, he enrolled at City College of New York, but was forced to drop out of college due to the Great Depression.

In 1934, Sagarin met Gertrude Liphshitz, a woman who shared his left-wing political interests. They married in 1936 and soon after, Gertrude gave birth to a boy. Sagarin established himself in the perfume and cosmetics industry, becoming knowledgeable about the chemistry of perfumes, and publishing The Science and Art of Perfumery in 1945.

Donald Webster Cory
Sagarin began a dual life, publishing The Homosexual in America: A Subjective Approach in 1951, which was deemed an "act of heroism", under the pseudonym of Donald Webster Cory. The use of the pen name, and the attitudes that differed when Sagarin used either of his identities, led to the comparison of Sagarin/Cory to the Dr. Jekyll/Mr Hyde character. Mr. Cory, who presented homosexuals as a despised minority, was seen as a "mythic hero", where Dr. Sagarin (as he would later be known) was a "hunchback deviant".

The publication of the book was considered a "radical step", as it was the first publication in the United States that discussed homosexual politics and sympathetically presented the plight of homosexuals. Sagarin described how homosexuals were discriminated against in almost all aspects of their lives and called for a repeal of anti-homosexuality laws;

One great gap separates the homosexual minority from all others, and that is its lack of recognition, its lack of respectability in the eyes of the public, and even in the most advanced circles.

A research report by Alfred Kinsey et al., Sexual Behavior in the Human Male (1948), had a beneficial effect on the reception of Sagarin's publication. In 1952, due to the success of The Homosexual in America: A Subjective Approach, Sagarin established a subscription book service called "Cory Book Service", which chose a gay-themed literary work each month. The Cory Book Service played a fundamental role in sparking the gay-rights movement in the US and helped other organizations such as the Mattachine Society and ONE magazine grow. It would change ownership multiple times and sending out recommendations of queer literature for 17 years.

Sagarin continued using his pseudonym, and released a second publication in 1953 called Twenty-One Variations on a Theme, an anthology of short stories dealing with homosexuality to which included pieces by Sherwood Anderson, Paul Bowles, Christopher Isherwood, Denton Welch, Charles Jackson, and Stefan Zweig.

1960s
In 1958 Sagarin joined Brooklyn College, completing his BA in an accelerated program, and in 1961 he entered an MA program in sociology, where he wrote a thesis on The Anatomy of Dirty Words. Throughout the 1960s, Cory remained one of the most conservative members of the Mattachine Society, and opposed the rejection of the "sickness theory" of homosexuality by some homophile leaders. His belief was that homosexuality was "a disturbance" that probably arose as a result of a pathological family situation. In 1963, he co-authored a book called The Homosexual and His Society with John LeRoy (pseudonym of Barry Sheer), which claimed that there was no such thing as a "well adjusted homosexual". In 1965 as Cory, he failed in his bid for presidency of the Mattachine Society. The loss of the presidency, and his difference in beliefs from other members of the Society, resulted in a disparity that directly influenced his education. Sagarin entered New York University's PhD program in sociology, graduating in 1966, submitting a dissertation titled "Structure and Ideology in an Association of Deviants", which was a study of the Mattachine Society. He did not, however, reveal his involvement in the society as Cory. His acceptance of the position of assistant professor at Baruch College, a campus of City University of New York, led some to characterise it as the beginning of his rise to "giant in the field of sociological deviance" and the recession of his part in the homophile movement.

1970s
In the 1970s, Sagarin pursued an active homosexual life, though he continued to characterise homosexuals as disturbed, and frequently urged them to seek therapy. He rejected the idea that homosexuality was a natural sexual variant, and criticised the new psychological and sociological studies of Evelyn Hooker and John Gagnon. However, he argued that homosexuality should be decriminalized.

The real identity of Sagarin's persona, Donald Webster Cory, remained unknown until a 1974 convention of the American Sociological Association in Montreal. On a panel entitled "Theoretical Perspectives on Homosexuality", Sagarin levelled criticism at the liberationist scholarship, and in response, Laud Humphreys exposed Sagarin by calling him "Mr. Cory". After the convention, Sagarin withdrew from issues concerning homosexuality.

On June 10, 1986, he died of a heart attack. At the time, he was serving as Dean Of The Graduate School Of The John Jay College Of Criminal Justice
in NYC.

Literary works

Edward Sagarin
The Science and Art of Perfumery (1945) New York, London: McGraw-Hill Book Company, Inc.
The anatomy of dirty words (1962) New York: L. Stuart
Nymphomania: a study of the oversexed woman (1964) New York: Gilbert Press (coauthor: Albert Ellis)
A pictorial history of the world's great trials, from Socrates to Eichmann (1967) New York: Crown Publishers (coauthor: Brandt Aymar)

People in places; The sociology of the familiar (1973) New York: Praeger
Laws and trials that created history (1974) New York: Crown 
Structure and Ideology in an Association of Deviants (1975) New York: Arno Press 
Norms and human behavior (1976) New York: Praeger 
Sex, crime, and the law (1977) New York: Free Press  (coauthor: Donal E.J. MacNamara)
Deviance and social change (1977) Beverly Hills, California: Sage Publications 
The Sociology of sex: An introductory reader (1978) New York: Schocken Books  (coeditor: James M. Henslin)
Taboos in criminology Beverly Hills, California: Sage Publications (1980) 
Raskolnikov and others: Literary images of crime, punishment, redemption, and atonement (1981) New York: St. Martin's Press 
Crime and Punishment: An Introduction to Criminology: Allen, Harry E.; Paul C. Friday; Julian B. Roebuck; Edward Sagarin . Free Press, 1981 .

Donald Webster CoryThe Homosexual in America: A Subjective Approach (1951) New York: Greenberg.   Spanish translation:  Mexico City:  EDIAPSA, 1952.Twenty-One Variations on a Theme (1953) New York: GreenbergHomosexuality; A cross cultural approach (1956) New York: Julian PressThe Homosexual and his Society: A View from Within (1963) New York: Citadel Press (coauthor: John P. Leroy) Violation of taboo; Incest in the great literature of the past and present (1963) New York: Julian Press (coauthor: R.E.L. Masters)The Lesbian in America'' (1964) New York: Citadel Press

References

1913 births
1986 deaths
20th-century American novelists
American criminologists
American male novelists
American people of Russian-Jewish descent
Brooklyn College alumni
City College of New York alumni
City University of New York faculty
Graduate Center, CUNY faculty
Jewish American writers
Jewish American scientists
LGBT Jews
American LGBT scientists
New York University alumni
Writers from Schenectady, New York
Educators from New York City
American LGBT novelists
American male essayists
20th-century American male writers
Novelists from New York (state)
20th-century American essayists
LGBT people from New York (state)
Baruch College faculty
LGBT academics
20th-century American Jews
20th-century American LGBT people